Hydroxyandrostenedione may refer to:

 11β-Hydroxyandrostenedione
 16α-Hydroxyandrostenedione

Androstanes